Events from the year 1859 in Denmark.

Incumbents
 Monarch – Frederick VII
 Prime minister – Carl Christian Hall (until 2 December), Carl Edvard Rotwitt

Events

 6 January  Aarhus Art Museum is founded.
 2 February  Tøxen's School is inaugurated in Køge.
 15 April – An act provides for the Royal Danish Navy as well as the Botanical Gardens to leave Gammelholm which is instead to undergo urban redevelopment. The Navy's activities are moved to Nyholm while the Botanical Gardens relocate to their current site.
 28 May – The poet Bernhard Severin Ingemann, a central figure of the Danish Golden Age, turns 70 and receives a golden horn from the women of Denmark at his home at Sorø Academy.
 9 August  The new Copenhagen Waterworks are unaugurated.
 20 September – Copenhagen Zoo is inaugurated.
 2 October – Illustreret Tidende, Denmark's first illustrated weekly, is published for the first time.
 17 December – Frederiksborg Castle is devastated by fire but Frederiksborg Chapel is saved.

Undated
 House numbers are introduced in Copenhagen
 Albani Brewery is founded in Odense.
 Fabrikken Øresund is founded in Copenhagen.
 The second Blaagaard Seminarium is founded.
 Hotel Marienlyst opens in Helsingør.

Births
 21 April – Christian Sonne, politician (died 1941)
 13 May – August Enna, composer (died 1939)
 16 June – Max Henius, biochemist, co-founder of the American Academy of Brewing (died 1935)
 25 June – Gerhard Heilmann, paleontologist, scientific illustrator (died 1946)
 18 August – Anna Ancher, painter (died 1935)
 20 August – Emma Eleonore Meyer, painter (died 1921)
 13 September – Anton Rosen, architect (died 1928)
 22 September – Rudolph Sophus Bergh, composer (died 1924)
 24 September – Christian Schmiegelow, businessman (died 1949)
 22 October
 Thomas Vilhelm Garde, naval officer, Greenland explorer (died 1926)
 Eline Hansen, feminist (died 1919)
 29 November – Adolf Heinrich-Hansen, painter (died 1925)
 10 December – Peder Mørk Mønsted, painter (died 1941)

Deaths
 13 March – Vilhelm Pedersen, artist, illustrator (born 1820)
 24 September – Emanuel Larsen, marine painter (born 1823)

References

 
1850s in Denmark
Denmark
Years of the 19th century in Denmark